Jeimy Bernárdez (born 3 September 1986 in Tela) is a Honduran runner. She competed in the 100 metres hurdles event at the 2012 Summer Olympics.

Personal best
Outdoor
100 m: 12.14 s (wind: -0.6 m/s) –  San José, 24 June 2011
100 m hurdles: 13.83 s A (wind: -0.6 m/s) –   Toluca, 21 July 2008
Indoor
60 m hurdles: 8.52 s –  Sevilla, 21 February 2009

Achievements

References

External links

1986 births
Living people
People from Tela
Honduran female hurdlers
Olympic athletes of Honduras
Athletes (track and field) at the 2012 Summer Olympics
Pan American Games competitors for Honduras
Athletes (track and field) at the 2007 Pan American Games
Athletes (track and field) at the 2011 Pan American Games
Central American Games gold medalists for Honduras
Central American Games medalists in athletics
Central American Games silver medalists for Honduras